Khomotso Johannes Phahlane is the former acting National Commissioner of the South African Police Service (SAPS), serving from  to . He was appointed after the suspension of Riah Phiyega. 
He was previously head of the SAPS Forensic Service from 2012 to 2015.

In February 2018, Phahlane and his wife appeared in court on charges of fraud and corruption.

On 30 July 2020, Phahlane was dismissed from the police after 3 years on suspension, after being found guilty of dishonest conduct. On 12 October 2020, Lieutenant-General Bonang Mgwenya, the country’s second-most senior police official and Phalane's former second-in-command, was arrested on charges of corruption, fraud, theft and money laundering involving about R200-million and afterwards appeared in Ridge Magistrates’ court. At the time of Mgwenya's arrest, she and Phahlane were among 14 fellow officers who were charged with corruption.

References

South African police officers
South African generals
Law enforcement in South Africa